Beyond the Law is a 1930 American western film directed by J. P. McGowan and starring Robert Frazer, Lane Chandler and Louise Lorraine. It was one of the final productions of the independent Rayart Pictures, under the name Raytone Talking Pictures. The company was later revived as Monogram Pictures.

Synopsis
Two cowboys assists locals on the California-Nevada border who are being terrorized by gang.

Cast
 Robert Frazer as 	Dan Wright
 Lane Chandler as Jack-Knife
 Louise Lorraine as 	Barbara Ringold
 Charles King as	Brand
 Edward Lynch as Jack Slade
 Robert Graves as Stoney Stone 
 Will Walling as Mr. Ringold 
 Jimmy Kane asTed Ringold 
 Franklyn Farnum as 	Army Lieutenant
 Harry Holden as Sheriff Stone
 George Hackathorne as Monty

References

Bibliography
 Pitts, Michael R. Poverty Row Studios, 1929–1940. McFarland & Company, 2005.
 Slide, Anthony. The New Historical Dictionary of the American Film Industry. Routledge, 2014.

External links
 

1930 films
1930 Western (genre) films
1930s English-language films
American Western (genre) films
Films directed by J. P. McGowan
American black-and-white films
Rayart Pictures films
1930s American films